Westerschouwen is a former municipality in the Dutch province of Zeeland.

The municipality was formed in a merger of the municipalities Burgh, Haamstede, Noordwelle, Renesse, and Serooskerke on January 1, 1961. As the name indicates, it covered the western part of the island of Schouwen.

On January 1, 1997, Westerschouwen merged with Brouwershaven, Bruinisse, Duiveland, Middenschouwen, and Zierikzee to form the new municipality of Schouwen-Duiveland.

References

States and territories established in 1961
1961 establishments in the Netherlands
Municipalities of the Netherlands disestablished in 1997
Former municipalities of Zeeland
History of Schouwen-Duiveland